Ebervale is an unincorporated community located in Hazle Township in Luzerne County, Pennsylvania. Ebervale is located along Pennsylvania Route 940, northeast of Hazleton and west of Jeddo.  The village takes its name from an Anglicization of the place name Ebbw Vale, a town in Wales.

References

Unincorporated communities in Luzerne County, Pennsylvania
Unincorporated communities in Pennsylvania